Manampaneva is a town and commune in Madagascar. It belongs to the district of Mandritsara, which is a part of Sofia Region. The population of the commune was estimated to be approximately 9,000 in 2001 commune census.

Only primary schooling is available in Manampaneva. 96% of the population of the commune are farmers, while an additional 3.75% receives their livelihood from raising livestock. The most important crops are rice and peanuts, while other important agricultural products are maize and cassava.  Services provide employment for only 0.25% of the population.

References and notes 

Populated places in Sofia Region